The Europe Zone was one of the three regional zones of the 1979 Davis Cup.

29 teams entered the Europe Zone, competing across 2 sub-zones. 25 teams entered the competition in the qualifying round, competing for 4 places in each sub-zone's main draw to join the 4 finalists from the 1978 Europe Zone. The winners of each sub-zone's main draw went on to compete in the Inter-Zonal Zone against the winners of the Americas Zone and Eastern Zone.

Italy defeated Great Britain in the Zone A final, and Czechoslovakia defeated Sweden in the Zone B final, resulting in both Italy and Czechoslovakia progressing to the Inter-Zonal Zone.

Zone A

Preliminary rounds

Draw

First round
Finland vs. Morocco

Greece vs. Denmark

Egypt vs. Portugal

Monaco vs. Soviet Union

Qualifying round
Poland vs. Finland

Italy vs. Denmark

Austria vs. Egypt

Spain vs. Soviet Union

Main draw

Draw

Quarterfinals
Poland vs. Italy

Austria vs. Spain

Semifinals
Italy vs. Hungary

Great Britain vs. Spain

Final
Italy vs. Great Britain

Zone B

Pre-qualifying round

Draw

Results
Turkey vs. Iran

Preliminary rounds

Draw

First round
Netherlands vs. Norway

Switzerland vs. Iran

Belgium vs. Ireland

Qualifying round
Netherlands vs. France

Switzerland vs. Yugoslavia

West Germany vs. Israel

Belgium vs. Romania

Main draw

Draw

Quarterfinals
France vs. Switzerland

Romania vs. West Germany

Semifinals
France vs. Czechoslovakia

Romania vs. Sweden

Final
Czechoslovakia vs. Sweden

References

Davis Cup Europe/Africa Zone
Europe Zone
Davis Cup
Davis Cup
Davis Cup
Davis Cup
Davis Cup
Davis Cup
Davis Cup